The 1957 Rutgers Scarlet Knights football team represented Rutgers University in the 1957 NCAA University Division football season. In their second season under head coach John Stiegman, the Scarlet Knights compiled a 5–4 record and outscored their opponents 181 to 133. The team's statistical leaders included Billy Austin with 479 passing yards and 946 rushing yards and Bob Simms with 180 receiving yards.

Schedule

References

Rutgers
Rutgers Scarlet Knights football seasons
Rutgers Scarlet Knights football